
Gmina Unisław is a rural gmina (administrative district) in Chełmno County, Kuyavian-Pomeranian Voivodeship, in north-central Poland.

Villages
Gmina Unisław contains the villages and settlements of Błoto, Bruki Kokocka, Bruki Unisławskie, Głażewo, Gołoty, Grzybno, Kokocko, Raciniewo, Stablewice and Unisław.

Neighbouring gminas
Gmina Unisław is bordered by the gminas of Chełmno, Dąbrowa Chełmińska, Kijewo Królewskie, Łubianka, Pruszcz and Zławieś Wielka.

References
Polish official population figures 2006

Unislaw
Chełmno County